Olga Kubassevich-Drobyshevskaya (born 22 September 1985 in Zaporizhzhia) is a Ukrainian and Kazakhstani volleyball player. She is 183 cm and plays as opposite. She plays for Türk Telekom Ankara. Team since 2007 and wear 5 number.

Clubs
 2002-2003 ZDIA Zaporizhzhia
 2004-2005 Jenestra Odesa
 2007-2009 Türk Telekom Ankara

References

CEV Athlete's biography
 Türk Telekom Ankara Official Website Profile

1985 births
Living people
Ukrainian women's volleyball players
Kazakhstani women's volleyball players
Türk Telekom volleyballers
Asian Games medalists in volleyball
Volleyball players at the 2006 Asian Games
Volleyball players at the 2010 Asian Games
Medalists at the 2010 Asian Games
Asian Games bronze medalists for Kazakhstan